Alfred "Friedel" Lutz (21 January 1939 – 7 February 2023) was a German professional footballer who played as a full-back. He spent most of his career with Eintracht Frankfurt. At international level, he made 12 appearances for the West Germany national team.

Club career 
Lutz was born in Bad Vilbel, Germany. He joined Eintracht Frankfurt in 1955 and carried on playing for the club until 1973. With Eintracht Frankfurt, he reached the 1959–60 European Cup final which Frankfurt lost 7–3 against Real Madrid. For the 1966–67 season he joined then Bundesliga title-holder 1860 Munich, but returned to Eintracht Frankfurt after a single injury plagued season.

International career 
Debuting for the West Germany national team on 3 August 1960, in Iceland a major injury prevented him from taking part in the 1962 FIFA World Cup for his country. However, he won a runner-up medal with the West Germans four years later at the 1966 FIFA World Cup. Lutz retired from playing for West Germany after that tournament, making his final appearance in the semi-final win over the Soviet Union (2–1). Overall he won 12 caps.

Personal life and death
Lutz was married and had a son. He died on 7 February 2023, at the age of 84.

References

External links
 
 
 
 

1939 births
2023 deaths
German footballers
Germany international footballers
Eintracht Frankfurt players
TSV 1860 Munich players
1966 FIFA World Cup players
Bundesliga players
Association football defenders
Recipients of the Silver Laurel Leaf
20th-century German people
People from Bad Vilbel
Sportspeople from Darmstadt (region)
Footballers from Hesse
West German footballers